Trirhabda is a genus of skeletonizing leaf beetles in the family Chrysomelidae. There are more than 30 described species in Trirhabda. They are found in North America and Mexico.

Species
These 33 species belong to the genus Trirhabda:

 Trirhabda adela Blake, 1931
 Trirhabda aenea Jacoby, 1886
 Trirhabda attenuata (Say, 1824)
 Trirhabda bacharidis (Weber, 1801) (groundselbush beetle)
 Trirhabda borealis Blake, 1931
 Trirhabda caduca Horn, 1893
 Trirhabda canadensis (Kirby, 1837) (goldenrod leaf beetle)
 Trirhabda confusa Blake, 1931
 Trirhabda convergens J. L. LeConte, 1865
 Trirhabda diducta Horn, 1893
 Trirhabda eriodictyonis Fall, 1907
 Trirhabda flavolimbata (Mannerheim, 1843)
 Trirhabda geminata Horn, 1893
 Trirhabda gurneyi Blake
 Trirhabda labrata Fall, 1907
 Trirhabda lewisii Crotch, 1873
 Trirhabda luteocincta (J. L. LeConte, 1858)
 Trirhabda majuscula Wickham, 1914
 Trirhabda manisi Hogue in Hatch, 1971
 Trirhabda megacephala Wickham, 1914
 Trirhabda nigriventris Blake, 1951
 Trirhabda nigrohumeralis Schaeffer
 Trirhabda nitidicollis J. L. LeConte, 1865
 Trirhabda pilosa Blake, 1931
 Trirhabda pubicollis Blake, 1951
 Trirhabda rugosa Jacoby, 1892
 Trirhabda schwarzi Blake, 1951
 Trirhabda sepulta Wickham, 1914
 Trirhabda sericotrachyla Blake, 1931
 Trirhabda sublaevicollis Jacoby, 1892
 Trirhabda variabilis Jacoby, 1886
 Trirhabda virgata J. L. LeConte, 1865
 Trirhabda viridicyanea Blake

References

Further reading

External links

 

Galerucinae
Articles created by Qbugbot
Chrysomelidae genera
Taxa named by John Lawrence LeConte